Uzair Jan Baloch (Urdu/) is a Pakistani gangster and former crime lord originally from Karachi, Pakistan. He was a key figurehead of Karachi underworld and notorious gang war in his hometown, Lyari, at his peak around 2012. Baloch is accused in various cases involving murder, extortion, drug trafficking, terrorism, and after being arrested many times, became a fugitive wanted by law enforcement agencies. Due to his influential ties, it is alleged that Baloch enjoyed political patronage and was "protected" by the ruling PPP from facing charges but was eventually nabbed after intervention of federal authorities. Baloch denies all the charges against him and says they are "politically motivated". He is also the former chief of the Peoples Aman Committee, which was a militant group linked to the Pakistan Peoples Party (PPP).

In September 2013, Baloch fled to Chabahar, Iran, after the Sindh Rangers launched a crackdown in Karachi against elements of organised crime. A dual Iranian citizen, where he was contacted by Iran's VAJA, to provide information on Pakistan's security apparatus and the political situation in Karachi. He moved onwards to Oman and in December 2015, he was arrested by the Interpol in Dubai while still in hiding.

Uzair then reappeared in Karachi, only to be arrested by the Rangers during a targeted operation. That same year, the Supreme Court of Pakistan took suo moto notice of his involvement in the murder of gangster Arshad Pappu, bringing his activities into attention.

Early life
Uzair Jan Baloch was born on 11 January 1979 in Lyari, Karachi. His father, Faiz Muhammad (known as Mama Faizu), was a transporter who originated from Iran's Sistan and Balochistan province. Some members of his family live in Iran and hold dual Iranian-Pakistani citizenship. In 2006, Uzair fled to Iran while escaping an operation against Lyari's street gangs. There, he obtained an Iranian passport and national identity card. In around 2010, his Iranian documents expired and he renewed them.

Baloch started off his career in politics as an independent candidate in the 2001 municipal elections for Lyari's mayorship, but lost to Habib Hassan of the Pakistan People's Party. In 2003, his father was kidnapped for ransom and brutally murdered by Arshad Pappu, son of the Lyari drug lord Haji Lalu. This is said to have marked Uzair's foray into organised crime, as he set out to avenge his father's murder. He initially pursued his father's murder case in courts, but received threats from Lalu's gang. Arshad Pappu happened to be a rival of gangster Rehman Dakait, Uzair's first cousin, with the two involved in a bitter conflict over land and drugs in Lyari. His cousin Rehman invited him to join his gang, and while Uzair initially refused, he later acquiesced as they shared a common enemy. Members of the two gangs started killing each other, with casualties reaching the hundreds. In 2009, Dakait was killed during a shootout with police and Uzair Baloch took over his gang. In 2013, Arshad Pappu and his brother Yasir Arafat were eventually kidnapped by Uzair's gang, tortured and beheaded. Their corpses were paraded before being burnt, and the ashes dumped in a sewer. Uzair Baloch and his associate Baba Ladla reportedly played football with the severed heads. The Friday Times quoted Baloch as having said: "It is karma – what goes around comes around", referring to the avenging of his father's murder.

Activities and arrests
In 2003, Uzair was arrested by a Sindh police SP Chaudhry Aslam but was later released on bail due to his links with politicians. After the encounter of Rehman Dakait, Uzair became the new gang leader and was involved in many criminal activities. He also became chief of Peoples Aman Committee. Uzair also had links with Pakistan Peoples Party and was protected by PPP until 2012.  In June 2014, Sindh Government issued his red warrants and head money of Rs.2 million. He was wanted for more than 50 cases of extortions, target killings of policemen and gang members. Uzair left Pakistan after his red warrants were issued. On 29 December 2015, he was arrested by Interpol from Dubai International Airport. He was taken into custody by Interpol and was brought back to Pakistan. He was travelling from Muscat to Dubai. On January 30, 2016, Sindh Rangers took Uzair into custody after getting his physical remand from Sindh High Court's administrative judge for the Anti Terrorism Courts. He was in Mithadar hostel, Karachi under the custody of Sindh Rangers. In February 2016, Uzair's wife Samina Baloch filed application in the Sindh High Court to seek orders for his medical examination and permission for his family members to meet him. On April 7, 2020, Uzair Baloch was sentenced to 12 years imprisonment and sent to the Central Jail Karachi after the completion of a military trial against him.

Total assets
According to Pakistani media reports, Uzair Baloch owns a four-story mansion in Lyari with an indoor swimming pool, in addition to a house worth 1.1 million dirhams in Dubai, an office in Dubai International City worth 0.5 million dirhams, a bungalow and plot in Muscat worth 0.9 million and 0.6 million dirhams respectively, and a property in Chabahar worth Rs. 10 million. The properties are registered under the names of his close relatives or friends. He also has four bank accounts in Dubai holding over 1 million dirhams, and acres of land in Chakiwara and Hub worth several millions of rupees. He also has the most expensive weapons and rifles in Pakistan.

References

1979 births
Baloch people
Living people
Iranian people of Pakistani descent
Pakistan People's Party politicians
Pakistani expatriates in the United Arab Emirates
Pakistani gangsters
Pakistani people of Iranian descent
People from Lyari Town
Politicians from Karachi